Scoparia niphetodes is a species of moth of the family Crambidae. It is found in Australia, where it has been recorded from Queensland.

References

Scorparia
Moths of Australia
Moths described in 1931